Ichmul (Ich Mùul in Modern Maya) is a small town in the Mexican state of Yucatan, municipality of Chikindzonot.

Populated places in Quintana Roo